Bilichodu  is a village in the southern state of Karnataka, India. It is located in the Jagalur taluk of Davanagere district in Karnataka.
It is located on the state highway connecting Davangere and Jaglur.

Demographics
 India census, Bilichodu had a population of 5269 with 2672 males and 2597 females.

See also
 Davanagere
 Districts of Karnataka

References

External links
 http://Davanagere.nic.in/

Villages in Davanagere district